Kyle Hughes-Odgers (born 1981) is an Australian artist and illustrator. He creates street art using figurative and abstract designs with bright colors. He has held exhibits in Australia, New York, Los Angeles, Singapore and Berlin. He has been involved in many large-scale public art exhibits including From Above in Australia which he painted for the Perth International Airport. He also painted a 4-story mural for Nst Mural Project in Washington D.C. in 2014. His work has been featured in art and design magazines such as Insite Magazine, The Wire Magazine, Sunday Times, Empty magazine, Ekosystem, Kingbrown magazine and Woodentoy magazine.

In 2013 he won the SCBWI Crystal Kite Award with Meg McKinlay for an illustrated children's book Ten Tiny Things. He has illustrated and published three additional books. In 2008 he was shortlisted for the Children's Book Council of Australia Crichton Award for new Illustrators.

References

External links 
 https://www.benchtalkpodcast.com/141-kyle-hughes-odgers/

Living people
1981 births
21st-century Australian artists